Friendzone is a dating/relationship reality television series produced by 495 Productions and airing on MTV. The show follows people who have romantic feelings for one of their friends. Sally Ann Salsano created the show based upon one of her personal experiences. The theme song is "Two Hearts" by Keegan DeWitt. The show ended on December 2, 2014.

Premise
Each episode of Friendzone features two stories. In each story, the person with romantic feelings (the crusher) wants to express these feelings to the target of his/her feelings (the crushee).

At the very beginning of the show, both crushers featured are introduced and each mentions their crushee. Of the 176 crusher-crushee pairs featured in seasons one through four, 157 are opposite-sex and 19 are same-sex (8 male pairs and 11 female pairs). Later both crushers mention the premise of the show. Each crusher tells the crushee that he or she is preparing for a blind date and asks the crushee for assistance. But the date is actually for the crushee. The crusher's goal is to get out of the "friend zone".

The first part of the show follows these preparations and the crusher speaks to the camera about his or her feelings towards the crushee. Often, the crusher talks about how nervous he or she is that the crushee will say yes or no. Some worry if the friendship will remain if the crushee refuses the date. The crushee will also talk to the camera about the crusher, often in a very positive but platonic manner, unaware of the crusher's feelings towards him or her.

After the crusher and crushee arrive at the location of the date, the crushee leaves the crusher ready for their date. On most stories, the crusher will then call back the crushee and then say that the blind date is really between the crusher and the crushee. The crushee will then respond to the crusher's feelings. Very rarely, the crusher gets cold feet and allows the crushee to walk away.

Sometimes the crushee will tell the crusher that the feelings are not mutual and suggest they remain friends. In these cases, the crusher will usually be upset and say so to the camera while the crushee will say his or her feelings as well.

Other times, the crushee will agree to the date. In these shows, the crusher will usually be very happy and show his or her joy to the camera. Then, the date will be shown. Not all dates wind up well. Some crushes have agreed to dates to be nice even though they really had no romantic feelings for the crusher and usually wind up mentioning the truth during or after the date, hurting the crusher's feelings. Other times, the date goes well and a relationship starts between the crusher and the crushee. In some cases, the crushee will already have romantic feelings for the crusher but was also too scared to express his or her feelings as well.

Production
Five seasons of Friendzone have aired, featuring 216 crusher-crushee pairs in 108 episodes.

Most of the episodes of the first season took place in the Northeast. All of the episodes of the second season were based in Florida. The third season was filmed in the Midwest, including more than one episode with students from the University of Michigan. All of the episodes in season four took place in California, Oregon, or Washington.

For the fifth season, there were casting calls in Atlanta, Charlotte, and Nashville.

Episodes

Season 1

Season 2

Season 3

Season 4

References

External links
 
 

2011 American television series debuts
2014 American television series endings
2010s American reality television series
American dating and relationship reality television series
English-language television shows
MTV original programming